The Green Bay Packers are a professional American football team based in Green Bay, Wisconsin. They are currently members of the North Division of the National Football Conference (NFC) in the National Football League (NFL), and are the third-oldest franchise in the NFL. The team has had representatives to the Pro Bowl every year since 1950 except for nine seasons. Below is a list of the Pro Bowl selections for each season.

Pro Bowl selections

Notes
Players did not play due to team advancement to Super Bowl XLV

References

See also
Green Bay Packers players
List of Pro Bowl players

G
Pro Bowlers
Pro Bowl selections